InformNapalm is a volunteer initiative to inform Ukrainian citizens and the foreign public about the Russo-Ukrainian War and the activities of the Russian special services as well as the militants of DPR, LPR, and Novorossiya. The team members are engaged in a wide range of other volunteer activities. Authors publish materials to 30 languages, including Japanese and Chinese.

History 
The Informnapalm.org website was created 29 March 2014 after the Russian military intervention in Ukraine and annexation of Crimea. During the existence of the project, volunteers conducted two profound investigations of the shoot-down  of Malaysia Airlines Flight 17 and gathered evidence of the presence of Russian troops in Ukrainian territory.

The main activities of the project are collecting and analysing OSINT-information, found in open sources, including social networks.   InformNapalm's investigation of 53rd Artillery Brigade commander colonel Sergei Muchkayev, suspected of killing the MH17 passengers, was used in the report of the Bellingcat research team.

After the Russian intervention in Syria, InformNapalm began publishing personal data of Russian pilots who bombarded Syrian cities, and together with the media project "Visuals" created infographics containing personal data of crew members. These publications have caused negative reactions in Russia, in particular, the Russian President's press secretary, Dmitry Peskov, has said that in response to the actions of the project "Russian special services will take all necessary measures". In response, the authors of the site said that "every violation the ceasefire in the Donbas by the joint Russian-separatist forces will cause the publication of another OSINT-investigation with names, photos, tactical and registration numbers and other details and facts related to Russian pilots crimes during a military operation in Syria". TV channel Al Arabiya compared this InformNapalm project activity with WikiLeaks publications.

Surkov leaks 

On 23 October 2016, Ukrainian hacker group CyberHunta published correspondence that it alleged was from the office email account of Vladislav Surkov, a political adviser to Vladimir Putin. Volunteers from InformNapalm requested additional evidence from an alliance of hacker groups that includes CyberHunta, FalconsFlame, and TRINITY. They secured the release of a 1GB Microsoft Outlook data file. InformNapalm reported that the hackers also were in possession of documents from 2015 and 2016 that were being analysed by intelligence agencies and were not released due to their operational value.

The document leak included 2,337 emails from Surkov's inbox. The emails illustrate Russian plans to politically destabilize Ukraine and the coordination of affairs with major opposition leaders in separatist Eastern Ukraine. The release included a document sent to Surkov by Denis Pushilin, former Chairman of the People's Council of the Donetsk People's Republic, listing casualties that occurred during 2014. It also included a 22-page outline of "a plan to support nationalist and separatist politicians and to encourage early parliamentary elections in Ukraine, all with the aim of undermining the government in Kyiv."

See also 
 OSINT

References

External links 
 
 InformNapalm channel on YouTube

Military intelligence
Russian–Ukrainian cyberwarfare
Ukrainian websites
Open-source intelligence
Citizen journalism
Intelligence websites
Ukrainian-language websites
Russian-language websites
Multilingual websites